Belonolaimus longicaudatus (Sting nematode) is a common parasite of grasses and other plant crops and products. It is the most destructive nematode pest of turf grass, and it also attacks a wide range of fruit, vegetable, and fiber crops such as citrus, cotton, ornamentals, and forage. The sting nematode is a migratory ectoparasite of roots. It is well established in many golf courses and presents a problem in turf management. The sting nematode is only present in very sandy soils. It cannot reproduce in heavier or clay soils.

History 
The genus was originally described by Steiner in 1942 but because of WWII the work was not published until 1949 (B. gracilis, Steiner 1949). Rau (1958) further refined the anatomical description and clarified the genus to note that there were several species, most common of which is B. longicaudatus.

Description
A long nematode compared to other plant parasitic nematodes at 2–3 mm for both the male and female. Description: The lip region is hemispherical, divided bilateral, dorsal, and ventral with grooves into four main lobes (two subdorsal and two subventral) each bearing six or more horizontal striations; two smaller lobes (lateral) with amphid apertures. The lip region is generally set off from the body by deep constriction, but this may be less marked in some populations. The lateral field is marked by a single incisure extending from the base of the lip region to near the tail terminus. The stylet is 100-140 micrometers long; it is very thin and flexible with rounded knobs. The excretory pore is posterior to median bulb. The esophageal gland is lobe-like and extends anteriorly over the intestine. The tail is 115-189 micrometers long with a rounded terminus.

Males: Outline of lip region is more flattened at the sides than in females but arrangement of lobes is similar. The testis is outstretched. Spicules are arcuate with ventral flanges and the distal ends pointed with small apical notches. The gubernaculum is well developed and there is a bursa enveloping the tail.

Female: The vulva is a transverse slit and the vulval lips do not protrude into the vagina which generally has an opposing pair of sclerotized pieces in the lateral view. There are two ovaries which are amphidelphic and outstretched. There is also a spermatheca present.

Distribution and economic importance
Sting nematodes are endemic to the southeastern United States and are only capable of reproducing in sandy soils.  This fact is the primary limiting factor in this nematodes distribution. The nematode has been reported in all the southeastern gulf states and additionally in Kansas, Oklahoma, New Jersey, Connecticut and Arkansas (Robbins and Barker, 1974). More recently it has been reported as a pest in Californian golf courses due to the transport of infested root stock. It is a major pest of golf courses (Luc et al. 2010) strawberries (Noling 2012) cotton (Crow et al. 2005), corn (Perry and Rhodes, 1982) and citrus (Duncan et al. 1996). The large size of the nematode paired with its ability to repeatedly feed from site to site on the root system of many crops makes this a formidable pest. Reduction of yield and substantial reduction in plant size have been reported for multiple crops.

Reproduction and life cycle 
The life cycle is around 24–28 days with optimum temperature being  (Huang and Becker, 1999; Robbins and Barker, 1974). The nematode survives extremes in temperature or drought by moving deeper into the soil (Robbins and Barker, 1974). All vermiform life stages feed on roots and feeding is required to mate and reproduce. Females must be fertilized by a male for viable eggs to be produced (Huang and Becker, 1999).

Host-parasite relationship 
The nematode feeds as an ectoparasite, most often at the site of cell division and elongation of the root (Huang and Becker, 1997). The long stylet allows the nematode to feed on the inner cortex and endodermis. The feeding at root tips causes root abbreviation and stunting (Crow and Han, 2005).  In corn roots swelling at root tips may occur due to repeated attempts by the plant to produce new root branches. In cotton the feeding may cause lesions which eventually cause root girdling.

Management
Historically, methyl bromide has been the chemical most often used to control sting nematodes however its scheduled removal from the market on January 1, 2015 (Rosskoph et al. 2005) has led to testing of new chemicals and biopesticides. Endospores of Pasteuria sp. have been tested on turf grass with mixed success (Luc et al. 2010). The extensive use of various chemicals in the strawberry and turf grass industries offers insight into the future of chemical control of nematodes which will surely involve a multifaceted approach. The leading candidate for most control is Telone (Noling 2012). Crop rotation is generally viewed as economically prohibitive due to the pests' wide host range.

Host list  
Host list from: Noling, J.W. (2012) "Nematode management in strawberries". Entomology and Nematology Department, Florida Cooperative Extension Service, Institute of Food and Agricultural Sciences, University of Florida.

 indicates a variable host response to geographic/physiologic races of sting nematode.

Turf, field and forage crops

Bluegrass, bentgrass, centipedegrass, St. Augustine grass, bahiagrass, Bermuda grass, pangola grass, fescue, corn, oats, millet, rye, wheat, peanut*, clovers, cotton, soybean, barley, Lespedeza.

Fruit and vegetable crops

Beans, carrots, celery, sweet corn, cowpea, eggplant, onion*, pea, citrus*, strawberry*, cabbage*, cantaloupe, cauliflower, endive, lettuce, tomato, turnip, okra*, cucumber*, snap bean, squash, pepper, sweet potato*, potato.

Cover crops 

Sesbania, sorghum/Sudan grass, iron clay pea, mung bean, pigeon pea, hairy vetch, joint vetch.

Use of poor or non-host cover crops within the rotation sequence may in some cases offer an effective approach to nematode control. Four leguminous cover crops adaptable for managing soil populations of sting or root-knot nematode include Iron Clay cowpea (Vigna unguiculata cv. 'Iron Clay'), sunn hemp (Crotalaria juncea), hairy indigo (Indigofena hirsuta) and American joint vetch (Aeschynomene americana). Sorghum is also a popular cover crop restoring large amounts of soil organic matter, but is a good host for sting nematode but not root-knot. Most of the small grains commonly used as winter cover crops in central and north Florida, such as rye, barley, wheat, or oats, can support limited reproduction of root-knot nematodes.

Common weeds

Crabgrass, Bermuda grass, fescues, lambsquarter*, cudweed, dog fennel, Johnson grass, beggarweed, ragweed, wild carrot, Spanish needle.

Poor hosts

Tobacco, watermelon*, asparagus, hot pepper, sunn hemp, hairy indigo, Crotalaria, velvet bean*, Bidens, horseweed, buckhorn plantain, pokeweed, sandbur, cocklebur*, jimson weed, sorrel, wild garlic, Jerusalem oak.

References 

Commonwealth Institute of Helminthology, Description of plant-parasitic nematodes, Set 3, No. 40 (1974)
Crow WT, Dickson DW, Weingartner DP, McSorley R, Miller GL.  2000. "Yield Reduction and Root Damage to Cotton Induced by Belonolaimus longicaudatus". Journal of Nematology. June, 32 (2): pp. 205–209.
Crow, WT, DP Weingartner, R McSorley, and DW Dickson. 2000. "Population dynamics of Belonolaimus longicaudatus in a cotton production system". Journal of Nematology 32: pp. 210–214.
Crow WT, Han HR. "Sting nematode". 2005 The Plant Health Instructor: .
Duncan LW, Noling JW, Inserra RN, and D Dunn. 1996. "Spatial Patterns of Belonolaimus spp. Among and Within Citrus Orchardson Florida's Central Ridge". Journal of Nematology, 28 (3): pp. 352–359.
Huang and Becker. 1997. "Invitro culture and feeding behavior of Belonolaimus Iongicaudatus on excised Zea mays roots". Journal of Nematology. 29 (3): pp. 411–415.
Huang, X, and JO Becker. 1999. "Lifecycle and mating behavior of Belonolaimus longicaudatus in gnotobiotic culture". Journal of Nematology 31: pp. 70–74.
Luc JE, Crow WT, McSorley R, Giblin-Davis RM. "Suppression of Belonolaimus longicaudatus with in vitro-produced Pasteuria sp. endospores". Nematropica. 2010 a;40: pp. 217–225.
Noling, JW 2012. "Nematode management in strawberries". Entomology & Nematology Department, Florida Cooperative Extension Service, Institute of Food and Agricultural Sciences, University of Florida.
Perry, VG, and H Rhoades.1982. "The genus Belonolaimus". pp. 144–149 in R.D. Riggs ed., Nematology in the Southern Region of the United States. Southern Cooperative Series Bulletin 276. Fayetteville, AR: University of Arkansas Agricultural Publications.
Rau, GJ 1958. "A new species of sting nematode". Proceedings of the Helminthological Society of Washington. 25: pp. 95–98.
Robbins, RT, and KR Barker. 1973. "Comparisons of host range and reproduction among populations of Belonolaimus longicaudatus from North Carolina and Georgia". The Plant Disease Reporter. 57: pp. 750–754.
Robbins, RT, and KR Barker. 1974. "The effects of soil type, particle size, temperature, and moisture on reproduction of Belonolaimus longicaudatus". Journal of Nematology 6: pp. 1–6.
Rosskopf, EN, Chellemi, DO, Kokalis-Burelle, N and GT Church. 2005. "Alternatives to Methyl bromide: A Florida Perspective". Plant Health Progress, American Phytopathological Society. 
Smart, GC and KB Nguyen. "Sting and awl nematodes". pp. 627–668 in WR Nickle, ed., Manual of Agricultural Nematology. Marcel Dekker Inc., NY.
Steiner, G (1949) "Plant nematodes the grower should know". Soil Science Society of Florida, Proceeding. 4-B: pp. 72–117.

External links 
 Nemaplex, University of California - Belonolaimus longicaudatus

Tylenchida
Agricultural pest nematodes